U. A. Latheef is an Indian politician belonging to Indian Union Muslim League. He was elected as a member of Kerala Legislative Assembly from Manjeri on 2 May 2021.

Early life
U. A. Latheef was born to Muhammad Haji at Manjeri around 1949. He was graduated as a Bachelor of Laws from Government Law College, Ernakulam in the year 1973. He is an Advocate by profession.

Political career
Earlier, U. A. Latheef had been the district general secretary of IUML and the district convener of UDF from the district of Malappuram. Due to the end of term of the last sitting MLA M. Ummer, Manjeri went to poll as a part of 2021 Kerala general election on 6 April 2021. U. A. Latheef was the candidate fielded by UDF from Manjeri. There were  registered voters in Manjeri Constituency for the election. U. A. Latheef won the election by a margin of 14,573 votes.

Election performance

References 

Indian Union Muslim League politicians
Living people
Kerala MLAs 2021–2026
Year of birth missing (living people)